Michelangelo Brancavalerio (October 1617 – 25 March 1683) was a Roman Catholic prelate who served as Bishop of Alatri (1648–1683).

Biography
Michelangelo Brancavalerio was born in Rome, Italy in October 1617 and ordained a priest on 16 March 1647.
On 4 May 1648, he was appointed during the papacy of Pope Innocent X as Bishop of Alatri.
On 17 May 1648, he was consecrated bishop by Ciriaco Rocci, Cardinal-Priest of San Salvatore in Lauro. 
He served as Bishop of Alatri until his death on 25 March 1683.

References

External links and additional sources
 (for Chronology of Bishops) 
 (for Chronology of Bishops)  

17th-century Italian Roman Catholic bishops
Bishops appointed by Pope Innocent X
1617 births
1683 deaths